Multienzyme complex contains several copies of one or several enzymes (polypeptide chains) packed into one assembly. Multienzyme complex carries out a single or a series of biochemical reactions taking place in the cells. It allows to segregate certain biochemical pathways into one place in the cell.

Examples include pyruvate dehydrogenase, fatty acid synthetase, glutamine synthetase, proteasome, rubisco.

See also
 Quaternary structure
 Protein complex
 Macromolecular assembly
 Biomolecular complex

References

Enzymes